Anthony Francis Cuccinello (November 8, 1907 – September 21, 1995) was an American professional baseball second baseman and third baseman, then a longtime coach. He was the older brother and uncle, respectively, of former major league players Al Cuccinello and Sam Mele. His surname was pronounced "coo-chi-NELL-oh".

He was selected for MLB's first All-Star Game, played on July 6,  at Comiskey Park, batting as a pinch-hitter for Carl Hubbell in the ninth inning. He also was selected for the 1938 All-Star Game.

On August 13, 1931, as a member of the Reds, he had six hits in six at bats, scoring four runs and recording five RBI in a 17–3 rout of the Braves.

During the 1945 season, the 37-year-old Cuccinello hit .308 for the White Sox, and just missed winning the American League batting title, one point behind Snuffy Stirnweiss' .309. Nevertheless, with the World War II manpower shortage ending and hundreds of big league players returning to the game from military service, he was released during the offseason.

In his 15-season career, Cuccinello was a .280 hitter with 94 home runs and 884 RBI in 1,704 games. His 1,729 career hits also included 334 doubles and 46 triples.

Cuccinello spent 1941 as the player-manager of the Jersey City Giants of the top-level International League. After being out of baseball in 1946, Cuccinello managed the 1947 Tampa Smokers (named after the city's large cigar business) of the Florida International League, then he spent 1948 as a coach for the Indianapolis Indians of the Triple-A American Association. He returned to the major leagues to coach with the Reds (1949–51), Cleveland Indians (1952–56), White Sox (1957–66; 1969) and Detroit Tigers (1967–68). He was the third-base coach under former teammate Al López in Cleveland and Chicago and was a member of Lopez'  and  American League championship teams. As a coach with Mayo Smith's Tigers, Cuccinello earned a ring with the  World Series champions.

Cuccinello died in Tampa, Florida, at the age of 87.

See also
List of Major League Baseball single-game hits leaders

References

External links

Interview of Tony Cuccinello conducted by Eugene Murdock on January 3, 1980, in Tampa, Florida: Part 1, Part 2
 
Baseball Historian
Baseball Library

1907 births
1995 deaths
American League All-Stars
Baseball coaches from New York (state)
Baseball players from New York (state)
Boston Bees players
Boston Braves players
Brooklyn Dodgers players
Chicago White Sox coaches
Chicago White Sox players
Cincinnati Reds coaches
Cincinnati Reds players
Cleveland Indians coaches
Columbus Senators players
Danville Veterans players
Detroit Tigers coaches
Jersey City Giants players
Lawrence Merry Macks players
Major League Baseball second basemen
Major League Baseball third base coaches
Minor league baseball managers
National League All-Stars
New York Giants (NL) players
New York Yankees scouts
People from Long Island City, Queens
Syracuse Stars (minor league baseball) players
Tampa Smokers players